Cordulagomphus is an extinct genus of dragonflies from the Cretaceous period.

See also 
 List of prehistoric insects

References

External links 
 

 

Cretaceous insects
†Cordulagomphus
Prehistoric Odonata genera
Anisoptera genera